Brno-Country District is a district in the South Moravian Region of the Czech Republic. Its capital is the city of Brno. The most populated town of the district is Kuřim. The district is made up of 187 municipalities, which is the highest number within all districts of the Czech Republic.

Administrative division
Brno-Country District is divided into seven administrative districts of municipalities with extended competence: Ivančice, Kuřim, Pohořelice, Rosice, Šlapanice, Tišnov, and Židlochovice.

List of municipalities
Towns are marked in bold and market towns in italics:

Babice nad Svitavou -
Babice u Rosic -
Běleč -
Bílovice nad Svitavou -
Biskoupky -
Blažovice -
Blučina -
Borač -
Borovník -
Branišovice -
Branišovice -
Bratčice -
Brumov -
Březina (former Blansko District) -
Březina (former Tišnov District) -
Bukovice -
Čebín -
Černvír -
Česká -
Chudčice -
Čučice -
Cvrčovice -
Deblín -
Dolní Kounice -
Dolní Loučky -
Domašov -
Doubravník -
Drahonín -
Drásov -
Hajany -
Heroltice -
Hlína -
Hluboké Dvory -
Holasice -
Horní Loučky -
Hostěnice -
Hradčany -
Hrušovany u Brna -
Hvozdec -
Ivaň -
Ivančice -
Javůrek -
Jinačovice -
Jiříkovice -
Kaly -
Kanice -
Katov -
Ketkovice -
Kobylnice -
Kovalovice -
Kratochvilka -
Křižínkov -
Kupařovice -
Kuřim -
Kuřimská Nová Ves -
Kuřimské Jestřabí -
Lažánky -
Ledce -
Lelekovice -
Lesní Hluboké -
Litostrov -
Loděnice -
Lomnice -
Lomnička -
Lubné -
Lukovany -
Malešovice -
Malhostovice -
Maršov -
Medlov -
Mělčany -
Měnín -
Modřice -
Mokrá-Horákov -
Moravany -
Moravské Bránice -
Moravské Knínice -
Moutnice -
Nebovidy -
Nedvědice -
Nelepeč-Žernůvka -
Němčičky -
Neslovice -
Nesvačilka -
Níhov -
Nosislav -
Nová Ves -
Nové Bránice -
Odrovice -
Ochoz u Brna -
Ochoz u Tišnova -
Olší -
Omice -
Opatovice -
Ořechov -
Osiky -
Oslavany -
Ostopovice -
Ostrovačice -
Otmarov -
Pasohlávky -
Pernštejnské Jestřabí -
Podolí -
Pohořelice -
Ponětovice -
Popovice -
Popůvky -
Pozořice -
Prace -
Pravlov -
Prštice -
Předklášteří -
Přibice -
Příbram na Moravě -
Přibyslavice -
Přísnotice -
Radostice -
Rajhrad -
Rajhradice -
Rašov -
Rebešovice -
Řícmanice -
Říčany -
Říčky -
Řikonín -
Rohozec -
Rojetín -
Rosice -
Rozdrojovice -
Rudka -
Senorady -
Sentice -
Šerkovice -
Silůvky -
Sivice -
Skalička -
Skryje -
Šlapanice -
Sobotovice -
Sokolnice -
Stanoviště -
Štěpánovice -
Strhaře -
Střelice -
Šumice -
Svatoslav -
Synalov -
Syrovice -
Telnice -
Těšany -
Tetčice -
Tišnov -
Tišnovská Nová Ves -
Trboušany -
Troskotovice -
Troubsko -
Tvarožná -
Újezd u Brna -
Újezd u Rosic -
Újezd u Tišnova -
Unín -
Unkovice -
Úsuší -
Velatice -
Veverská Bítýška -
Veverské Knínice -
Viničné Šumice -
Vlasatice -
Vohančice -
Vojkovice -
Vranov -
Vranovice -
Vratislávka -
Všechovice -
Vysoké Popovice -
Žabčice -
Zakřany -
Zálesná Zhoř -
Zastávka -
Žatčany -
Zbraslav -
Zbýšov -
Žďárec -
Želešice -
Železné -
Zhoř -
Židlochovice

Geography

Brno-Country District surrounds the city of Brno from all sides and thus has a non-standard shape and diverse character: hilly and forested in the northern part and flat and deforested in the southern part. The territory extends into six geomorphological mesoregions: Upper Svratka Highlands (north), Křižanov Highlands (west), Dyje–Svratka Valley (south), Bobrava Highlands (southwest and northeast), Boskovice Furrow (a strip along the Bobrava Highlands across the territory) and Drahany Highlands (east).

The longest rivers are the Svratka, which flows across the entire territory from north to south, and Jihlava, which flows from the west and joins the Svratka before the southern district border. Other important rivers are the Oslava, Svitava and Litava. There are not many bodies of water. The only exception is the southernmost part of the territory with a system of ponds and with a part of Nové Mlýny reservoirs.

Part of the Moravian Karst Protected Landscape Area extends into the district in the east and is the only large-scale protected area in the district.

Demographics

Most populated municipalities

Economy
The largest employers with its headquarters in Brno-Country District and at least 500 employers are:

Transport
The D1 motorway from Prague to Brno and Ostrava leads across the district. The D2 motorway separates from it and leads from Brno to Czech-Slovak border. There is also the short section of the D52 motorway from Brno to Pohořelice, which further continues as the I/53 road to Znojmo.

Sights

The most important monuments in the district, protected as national cultural monuments, are:
Pernštejn Castle
Porta coeli Convent
Rosice Castle

The best-preserved settlements and landscapes, protected as monument zones, are:
Doubravník
Ivančice
Lomnice
Battlefield of the Battle of Austerlitz (partly)

The most visited tourist destinations are Aqualand Moravia water park in Pasohlávky and the Pernštejn Castle.

References

External links

Brno-Country District profile on the Czech Statistical Office's website

 
Districts of the Czech Republic